How the Grinch Stole Christmas (also known as Dr. Seuss' How the Grinch Stole Christmas, released in the UK as The Grinch) is a 2000 American Christmas fantasy comedy film directed by Ron Howard, who also produced with Brian Grazer, from a screenplay written by Jeffrey Price and Peter S. Seaman. The film was based on Dr. Seuss's 1957 children's book of the same name, as the first Dr. Seuss book to be adapted into a full-length feature film and the first of only two live-action Dr. Seuss films, followed by The Cat in the Hat in 2003. This was also the second adaptation of the book, after the 1966 animated TV special of the same name.

Narrated by Anthony Hopkins, it stars Jim Carrey as the eponymous character, with Taylor Momsen, Jeffrey Tambor, Christine Baranski, Bill Irwin and Molly Shannon in supporting roles. The film centers on the Grinch, a misanthropic green creature who lives in a cave on nearby Mount Crumpit and despises the celebrations, as he attempts to sabotage their holiday plans in Whoville.

Produced by Imagine Entertainment, How the Grinch Stole Christmas was released by Universal Pictures in the United States on November 17, 2000. It received mixed reviews from critics, though Jim Carrey's performance received praise. The film spent four weeks as the #1 film in the United States and grossed $345 million worldwide, making it the sixth-highest grossing film of 2000. At the time, it also became the second-highest-grossing holiday film of all time, behind Home Alone (1990), until both films were surpassed in 2018 by the third film adaptation of the story. It won the Academy Award for Best Makeup, being nominated for Best Art Direction and Best Costume Design.

Plot

As the inhabitants of Whoville are getting ready for Christmas, the Grinch, a misanthropic green creature who lives in a cave on nearby Mount Crumpit, despises the celebrations and attempts to sabotage their holiday plans. Six-year-old Cindy Lou Who believes that everyone is too focused on gifts and festivities and not enough on personal relationships. She encounters the Grinch at the post office, where he is scrambling the delivery of Christmas cards and packages. Surprised by his sinister appearance, Cindy falls into the giant mail-sorting machine and gets stuck, but the Grinch grudgingly saves her. This convinces her that he cannot be as completely evil as the townsfolk believe, and she starts researching his past, learning how he came to be such an angry, plotting recluse.

The Grinch arrived in Whoville as a baby and was adopted by two women. In school, the timid Grinch  was infatuated with Martha May Whovier, a girl in his class who secretly reciprocated his feelings. However, classmate Augustus MayWho bullied him, jealous that Martha liked Grinch and not him. That Christmas, the young Grinch made an angel as a gift for Martha, but accidentally cut his face while trying to shave when MayWho mockingly suggested he had a beard. When MayWho, the teacher, and the rest of the class saw his cut face the next day, all but Martha laughed at him. This causes Grinch to lose his temper, declare his hatred for Christmas, and flee to Mount Crumpit, where he has lived a solitary, scheming life ever since.

Cindy nominates the Grinch as the town's Holiday Cheermeister, outraging MayWho, who is now the mayor. She climbs Mount Crumpit to invite the Grinch to the celebration, and he eventually accepts, realizing he could potentially encounter Martha there, now the Lou Whos' neighbor, and finally upset MayWho. As Cheermeister, he participates in various events and begins enjoying himself, until MayWho gives him an electric razor as a gift, reminding him of his childhood humiliation. MayWho then offers Martha a new car while publicly proposing to her. Enraged, the Grinch snaps and berates both the people's materialism and love for Christmas. He shaves MayWho's head, burns down the town's Christmas tree with a makeshift flamethrower (the Whos have a backup tree, however) and goes on a rampage before returning home.

Disgusted with the festivities, the Grinch vows to crush the town's spirit by stealing all of their presents, decorations and food while they sleep. He disguises himself as Santa Claus and his pet dog Max as a reindeer, and descends into Whoville on a hi-tech sleigh. The first house he enters is Cindy's, and when she catches him stealing their tree, he lies to her to facilitate his escape. He singlehandedly strips the entire town of Christmas cheer, stuffing everything into a giant sack, then climbs back to the summit of Mount Crumpit to hurl the sack off of the mountain. Awakening on Christmas morning, the people are horrified to discover the theft, and MayWho blames Cindy for enabling the Grinch to ruin the town's spirit. However, her cheerful father, postmaster Lou Lou Who, defends her, declaring that she has tried to tell them that Christmas is not about decorations and gifts, but about spending time with family and friends. The townsfolk agree, join hands, and begin Christmas carolling.

Just as he is about to push the sack off the top of Mount Crumpit, the Grinch hears the people singing; realising he has failed to prevent the festivities, he understands the true meaning of Christmas. As he breaks down in tears, the sleigh full of gifts, Christmas trees and decorations begins to slide over the edge of the cliff, along with Cindy, who has climbed aboard to spend Christmas with him. After saving the loaded sleigh and Cindy, they ride down the mountain to return everything. He apologizes for his scheme and surrenders to the police, who accept his apology and deny MayWho's demand to arrest and pepper spray him. Realising MayWho's cruelty, Martha returns his engagement ring and declares her love for the Grinch. Later, the reformed Grinch invites the townsfolk over for the Christmas feast, where he personally carves the Roast Beast himself in his cave.

Cast
 Jim Carrey as the Grinch, a bad-tempered, devious and misanthropic green-furred creature who despises Christmas and the Whos of Whoville. Before Carrey was cast as the Grinch, Jack Nicholson, Robin Williams, Dustin Hoffman, Nicolas Cage, Tom Hanks, Tim Curry and Eddie Murphy were all considered.
 Josh Ryan Evans as the eight-year-old Grinch (his final film role before his death in 2002).
 Taylor Momsen as Cindy Lou Who (in the film, she is six years old, while in the 1957 book and the 1966 TV special she is "no more than two")
 Jeffrey Tambor as Mayor Augustus MayWho, Whoville's arrogant and judgmental mayor
 Ben Bookbinder as eight-year-old Augustus MayWho, who bullies Grinch as an attempt to get Martha to notice him instead.
 Christine Baranski as the grown-up Martha May Whovier, who is mutually in love with the Grinch. Mayor Augustus Maywho also has feelings for her, but Martha does not like him because of his arrogance. 
 Landry Allbright as 8-year-old Martha May Whovier, who shows affection for the Grinch and dislikes when kids at school pick on him. 
 Bill Irwin as Louie Lou Who, Cindy's father
 Molly Shannon as Betty Lou Who, Cindy's mother
 Anthony Hopkins as the narrator
 Kelley as Max, the Grinch's pet dog and sole companion
 Frank Welker performing the vocal effects for Max
 Clint Howard as Whobris, the mayor's sycophantic aide and servant
 Reid Kirchenbauer as eight-year-old Whobris
 Mindy Sterling as Clarnella Who, one of the Grinch's adoptive mothers
 Rachel Winfree as Rose Who, the Grinch's other adoptive mother
 Jeremy Howard as Drew Lou Who, one of the mischievous sons of Louie and Betty and brother of Cindy
 Tyler Stevenson as Stu Lou Who, the other mischievous son and brother of Cindy
 Jim Meskimen as Officer Wholihan, the chief of police
 Mary Stein as Miss Rue Who, the Grinch's school teacher who later becomes Cindy's teacher
 Deep Roy as Post Office Clerk
 Rance Howard as Elderly Timekeeper
 Verne Troyer as Band Member
 Bryce Dallas Howard as Surprised Who

Production 

Before his death in 1991, Dr. Seuss refused offers to sell the film rights to his books. After his death, his widow Audrey Geisel agreed to several merchandising deals, including clothing lines, accessories and CDs. In July 1998, her agents announced via letter that she would auction the film rights of How the Grinch Stole Christmas. To pitch their ideas to Geisel, the suitors had to be willing to pay $5 million, 4% of the box-office gross, 50% of the merchandising revenue and music-related material, and 70% of the income from book tie-ins. The letter also stated that "any actor submitted for the Grinch must be of comparable stature to Jack Nicholson, Jim Carrey, Robin Williams and Dustin Hoffman." Additionally, it was stipulated that the estate would not consider a director or writer who had not earned at least $1 million on a previous picture.

20th Century Fox pitched its version with director Tom Shadyac and producers Dave Phillips and John Davis in attendance, with Nicholson in mind to play the Grinch. The Farrelly brothers and John Hughes pitched their own versions. Universal Pictures held its presentation with Brian Grazer and Gary Ross in attendance. Geisel refused each offer. Grazer then enlisted his producing partner Ron Howard to help with the negotiations. At the time, Howard was developing a film adaptation of The Sea-Wolf. Despite being an avid fan of the animated Grinch special, he did not express interest in a live-action version. However, Grazer talked him into traveling to Geisel's residence for the pitch meeting. While studying the book, Howard became interested in the character Cindy Lou Who, and pitched a film in which she would have a larger role, as well as a materialistic representation of the Whos and an expanded backstory for the Grinch.

In September 1998, Howard signed to direct and co-produce the film, with Jim Carrey in the lead role. It was also reported that Universal Pictures paid $9 million for the film rights for Grinch and Oh, the Places You'll Go! to Geisel. Before Howard signed on, Tim Burton was asked to direct, but turned it down due to a scheduling conflict with Sleepy Hollow. Jeffrey Price and Peter S. Seaman (of both Who Framed Roger Rabbit and Doc Hollywood fame) wrote the final screenplay after eight drafts, but Geisel also had veto power over the script. She objected to several of its jokes and sexual innuendos, including one about a family who did not have a Christmas tree or presents, jokingly called the "Who-steins"; and the placement of a stuffed trophy of the Cat in the Hat on the Grinch's wall. Alec Berg, David Mandel and Jeff Schaffer (who were also writers on the television series Seinfeld) did an uncredited rewrite.

Principal photography took place from September 1999 to January 2000. Geisel visited the set in October. Most of the Whoville set was built on the Universal Studios Backlot, behind the Bates Motel set from Psycho. Rick Baker designed and created the prosthetic makeup for Carrey and the rest of the cast. It took a number of tests, and ultimately Carrey admiring a photo of Baker in his first test makeup, for the decision to use Baker's original design. The Grinch suit was covered in yak hair, dyed green, and sewed onto a spandex suit. Application of the makeup took up to two and a half hours; after one such session, a frustrated Carrey kicked a hole in the wall of his trailer. Carrey's makeup artist Kazu Hiro recounted, "On set, [Carrey] was really mean to everybody, and at the beginning of the production they couldn't finish. After two weeks we only could finish three days' worth of shooting schedule, because suddenly he would just disappear, and when he came back, everything was ripped apart. We couldn't shoot anything." Hiro left the production until Baker and Howard had a discussion with Carrey on how important he was to the project. Carrey agreed to keep his anger in check and Hiro returned. Josh Ryan Evans, who played the eight-year old Grinch, wore the same style of makeup and bodysuit Carrey wore. In total, Carrey spent 92 days in the Grinch make-up and became adept at remaining calm during its application. Most of the appliances the actors wore were noses that connected to an upper lip along with some dentures, ears and wigs.

Music

Soundtrack

The soundtrack for the album was released on November 7, 2000. It features a collection of music performed by several artists, including Busta Rhymes, Faith Hill, Eels, Smash Mouth, and NSYNC.

An expanded edition of the soundtrack featuring more cues from Horner's score was released on November 1, 2022 on La-La Land Records.

All song lengths via Apple Music.

Release

Theatrical
How the Grinch Stole Christmas was released by Universal Pictures in the United States on November 17, 2000.

Television
It premiered on television on ABC on November 25, 2004 and aired there until 2014 (with the exception of 2009). From 2010–14 it was coupled with the animated television special. It currently airs annually on Freeform's (formerly ABC Family) 25 Days of Christmas. The American television airings include deleted footage which was not included on the original, theatrical, or VHS/DVD releases. The scenes include Cindy's dad maxing out his credit card on Christmas gifts, Cindy asking her dad who the Grinch was before heading off to school, Lou visiting Cindy being made to stay after school after mentioning the Grinch, extended scenes of the post office, the Grinch in his cave, Cindy inviting the Grinch to the Christmas party, Martha May and Betty Lou competing in the Christmas Lights Contest, the Grinch trying out different outfits to wear at the Christmas party, the Grinch drinking eggnog, the Whos passing out gifts to each other, and Cindy's family getting ready for Christmas morning at night.

Since 2015 (like the 1966 cartoon) it has aired on NBC during Christmas night after the animated television special. It was not aired in 2022 due to an NFL game between the Tampa Bay Buccaneers and the Arizona Cardinals. It aired on FX to promote the television broadcast premiere of the 2018 animated film in 2020.

Marketing
In the summer of 2000, a trailer for How the Grinch Stole Christmas premiered in theaters. It was hooked up to screenings of Mission: Impossible 2, in which Paramount Pictures agreed to screen the trailer if Universal included a trailer to a Paramount film in front of Nutty Professor II: The Klumps. The next trailer debuted on October 6, 2000 with the release of Meet the Parents. Meanwhile, Toys "R" Us began promoting the film, transforming their locations into Whobilation Headquarters with the most aggressive visual merchandising display in the company's history. Shoppers would be wowed from the moment they entered the store by the unbelievable displays and visual elements featuring the Grinch. The Herald Square location in New York City featured floor-to-ceiling themed window graphics of the film's main characters. Moreover, the entrances featured  3D film characters at numerous stores. Wendy's would even begin selling kids meal toys at their restaurants. Other promotional partners included Kellogg's, Nabisco, Hershey's, Visa, Coca-Cola and United States Postal Service.

To coincide with the release of the film, Universal Studios Hollywood and Universal's Islands of Adventure began hosting a holiday event called Grinchmas.

Home media
The film was released on VHS and DVD on November 20, 2001. Within its first week of release, the film sold a combined total of 8.5 million home video units, selling 3 million DVD copies and 4 million VHS copies, making it the bestselling holiday home video title at the time. It would go on to join Star Wars: Episode I – The Phantom Menace, Shrek and The Mummy Returns as one of the only four films to sell more than 2 million DVD copies during their opening weeks. Overall, it was ranked as the second-highest opening week home video sales for any live-action film, after Titanic. In December 2001, Variety reported that it was the second biggest selling home video release of 2001, selling 16.9 million copies and earning $296 million in sales revenue. A Blu-ray/DVD combo pack was released on October 13, 2009, then later given a separate Blu-ray release on October 13, 2015. It was also remastered in 4K and released on Ultra HD Blu-ray on October 17, 2017.

Reception

Box office
How the Grinch Stole Christmas grossed $260 million domestically and $85.1 million in other territories for a worldwide gross of $345.1 million, becoming the sixth highest-grossing film of 2000.

In the United States, the film opened at #1 on its opening day, making $15.6 million, with a weekend gross of $55.1 million, for an average of $17,615 from 3,127 theaters. Upon its release, it had the sixth-highest three-day opening weekend of any film, behind Toy Story 2, X-Men, Mission: Impossible 2, Star Wars: Episode I – The Phantom Menace and The Lost World: Jurassic Park. Moreover, the film surpassed Batman Forever to achieve the largest opening weekend for a Jim Carrey film. How the Grinch Sole Christmas had the biggest opening weekend for a Ron Howard film, smashing the previous record held by Ransom. It was the first non-Disney film to win the Thanksgiving weekend box office since Mrs. Doubtfire in 1993. It held the record for the highest opening weekend for a Christmas-themed film for 18 years, until the 2018 film version of The Grinch surpassed it with $67.6 million. 

In its second weekend, the film grossed $52.1 million, dropping only 5.1%, setting a new record for highest-grossing second weekend for any film at the time, beating The Phantom Menace. It stayed at the top of the box office for four weekends until it was overtaken by What Women Want and Dude, Where's My Car? in mid-December. How the Grinch Stole Christmas continued to draw holiday crowds while defeating another family-oriented film, The Emperor's New Groove. By this point, it surpassed Mission: Impossible 2 to become the year's top-grossing film. The film closed on March 1, 2001, with a final domestic gross of $260,044,825. Box Office Mojo estimates that it sold over 48.1 million tickets in North America.

Critical response
The website's critical consensus reads, "Jim Carrey shines as the Grinch. Unfortunately, it's not enough to save this movie. You'd be better off watching the TV cartoon." On Metacritic, the film has a weighted average score of 46 out of 100 based on 29 critics, indicating "mixed or average reviews". Audiences polled by CinemaScore gave the film an average grade of "A−" on an A+ to F scale.

Roger Ebert gave the film two out of four stars, referring to it as "a dank, eerie, weird movie about a sour creature" and said, "There should be ... a jollier production design and a brighter look overall ... It's just not much fun." Ebert observed that Carrey "works as hard as an actor has ever worked in a movie, to small avail". Nevertheless, he decided that "adults may appreciate Carrey's remarkable performance in an intellectual sort of way and give him points for what was obviously a supreme effort".

Paul Clinton of CNN declared that Carrey "was born to play this role" and noted that "Carrey carries nearly every scene. In fact, if he's not in the scene, there is no scene." Owen Gleiberman of Entertainment Weekly began his review of the film analyzing the Grinch's "mischievously divided, now-I'm-calm/ now-I'm-a-raving-sarcastic-PSYCH-o! personality" and summed up Carrey's Grinch as "a slobby, self-loathing elitist ruled by the secret fear that he's always being left out of things." Gleiberman expressed surprise at "how affecting Carrey makes the Grinch's ultimate big-hearted turnaround, as Carrey the actor sneaks up on Carrey the wild-man dervish. In whichever mode, he carreys  the movie."

Peter Stack of the San Francisco Chronicle said, "Nobody could play the Grinch better than Jim Carrey, whose rubbery antics and maniacal sense of mischief are so well suited to How the Grinch Stole Christmas. Dr. Seuss himself might have turned to Carrey as a model for the classic curmudgeon had the actor been around in 1957." However, he wondered why Carrey "made himself sound like Sean Connery" and warned that the character's intensity may frighten small children. James Berardinelli of ReelViews wrote that Carrey's "off-the-wall performance is reminiscent of what he accomplished in The Mask, except that here he never allows the special effects to upstage him. Carrey's Grinch is a combination of Seuss's creation and Carrey's personality, with a voice that sounds far more like a weird amalgamation of Sean Connery and Jim Backus (Bond meets Magoo!) than it does Karloff." He concluded that Carrey "brings animation to the live action, and, surrounded by glittering, fantastical sets and computer-spun special effects, Carrey enables Ron Howard's version of the classic story to come across as more of a welcome endeavor than a pointless re-tread."

Some reviews were more polarized. Stephanie Zacharek of Salon in a generally negative review of the film, wrote that "Carrey pulls off an admirable impersonation of an animated figure ... It's fine as mimicry goes – but mimicry isn't the best playground for comic genius. Shouldn't we be asking more of a man who's very likely the most gifted comic actor of his generation?" She concluded that in spite of "a few terrific ad-libs ... his jokes come off as nothing more than a desperate effort to inject some offbeat humor into an otherwise numbingly unhip, nonsensical and just plain dull story".

Todd McCarthy of Variety wrote, "Carrey tries out all sorts of intonations, vocal pitches and delivery styles, his tough guy posturing reminding at times of Cagney and his sibilant S's recalling Bogart. His antic gesturing and face-making hit the mark at times, but at other moments seem arbitrary and scattershot. Furthermore, his free-flowing tirades, full of catch-all allusions and references, are pitched for adult appreciation and look destined to sail right over the heads of pre-teens."

Accolades

See also

 Grinch
 The Grinch (film)
 The Grinch (video game)
 List of Christmas films

References

External links

 
 
 
 
 

2000s American films
2000 films
2000 comedy films
2000 fantasy films
2000s Christmas comedy films
2000s children's fantasy films
2000s children's comedy films
2000s English-language films
2000s fantasy comedy films
American films with live action and animation
American Christmas comedy films
American children's fantasy films
American children's comedy films
American fantasy comedy films
American films about revenge
Children's Christmas films
Films about orphans
Films about bullying
Films about consumerism
Films based on children's books
Films based on works by Dr. Seuss
Films directed by Ron Howard
Films produced by Ron Howard
Films produced by Brian Grazer
Films with screenplays by Jeffrey Price and Peter S. Seaman
Films scored by James Horner
Films shot in Los Angeles County, California
Films shot in Utah
Films that won the Academy Award for Best Makeup
The Grinch (franchise)
Imagine Entertainment films
Universal Pictures films